Branko "Đuro" Mamula (30 May 1921 – 19 October 2021) was a Serbian politician and Yugoslav officer who participated in World War II in Yugoslavia. He was later the Minister of Defence of Yugoslavia from 1982 to 1988.

Biography
Mamula was born in Kordun in May 1921 to an ethnic Serb family. He joined League of Communist Youth of Yugoslavia in 1940 and at the start of World War II in Yugoslavia in 1941 he joined the Yugoslav Partisans. In 1942, he joined Communist Party of Yugoslavia. During the war, he was put in charge of numerous units, moving through the ranks of the Partisans. Before he became the Defence Minister, he held the rank of Admiral as Chief of the General Staff of the Yugoslav People's Army from 1979 to 1982. After becoming Defence Minister in 1983, he was promoted to Admiral of the fleet. He lived in Opatija from 1985 until 1991. 

From 2007, he lived in Tivat, Montenegro. Mamula turned 100 in May 2021. He died on 19 October 2021, from COVID-19 during the COVID-19 pandemic in Montenegro.

Honours

National Honours
:
Order of the Hero of Socialist Labour
Great Star of the Order of the Yugoslav Star
Order of the People's Army (3x recipient)
Order of Labour with Red Banner
Great Star of the Order of Military Merit (2x recipient)
Order of Merits for the People with Golden Star
Order of Brotherhood and Unity with Golden Wreath
Order of the Partisan Star with Rifles
Commemorative Medal of the Partisans of 1941

Foreign Honours
: Grand Officer of the Legion of Honour
: Partisan Cross
: 1st Class of the Order of the Republic
: Grand Officer of the Order of Merit of the Italian Republic
: Member 1st Class of the Order of the Gurkha Right Arm
: Navy Meritorious Service Star, 1st Class
: Grand Cordon of the Order of the Republic
: Grand Commander of the Order of Honour
: Grand Star of the Decoration of Honour for Services to the Republic of Austria
: Grand Cordon of the Al-Hussein Order of Military Merit

References

1921 births
2021 deaths
People from Gvozd
Serbs of Croatia
Yugoslav communists
Serbian centenarians
Croatian centenarians
Men centenarians
Yugoslav Partisans members
Admirals of the Yugoslav People's Army
Chiefs of Staff of the Yugoslav People's Army
Central Committee of the League of Communists of Yugoslavia members
League of Communists – Movement for Yugoslavia politicians
Deaths from the COVID-19 pandemic in Montenegro
Recipients of the Order of the Hero of Socialist Labour
Recipients of orders, decorations, and medals of Sudan